The discography of British rock band Manfred Mann's Earth Band consists of 17 studio albums, 3 live albums, 7 compilation albums, 5 video albums, and 37 singles. Manfred Mann's Earth Band have been releasing albums and singles since 1971.

The Earth Band was formed in 1971 by South African musician Manfred Mann after the break-up of Chapter Three. Mann formed the Earth Band as a progressive rock group to break away from the pop genre.

The band's albums have charted in at least 8 countries and their singles have charted in at least 5. The group is most notable remembered for their cover versions of Bruce Springsteen songs, including "Blinded by the Light", which topped the singles charts in the United States and Canada. The group's albums have been the most successful in Norway, where a total of 7 released peaking in the top 10 of the VG-lista albums chart.

Studio albums

Live albums

Compilation albums

Video albums

Singles

See also
 Manfred Mann discography

Notes

References

External links 
Manfred Mann's Earth Band - Discography 1971-2005 (The Albums)

Manfred Mann's Earth Band
Blues discographies
Rock music group discographies